Focus Lighting is a New York City based architectural lighting design firm founded by Paul Gregory in 1987.

Focus Lighting designs include the Entel Tower in Santiago, Chile, which was the first automated color changing exterior lighting display in the world and the first building to have an automatic color-change at night. The 40-story tower opened in October 1994. Focus Lighting also designed the Times Square Ball for its 100th and 101st anniversaries.

Focus Lighting creates lighting designs for hotels, restaurants, residences, retail stores, art installations, sports venues, and museums. Their design philosophy centers on creating an emotion with light.

Notable works
Previous works include the lighting design for:
 Atlantis Resort (Palm Island, Dubai)
 Atmosphere on the 122nd floor of the Burj Khalifa (Dubai, UAE)
 Aureole (NYC)
 Bourbon Steak (Phoenix, AZ)
 Cloud Installation for Boffo Showhouse
 Condado Plaza Hotel (San Juan, Puerto Rico)
 Dream Hotel (NYC)
 Entel Tower (Santiago, Chile)
 Letifly Lighting NYC High quality lighting retailer
 Dinosaur Hall Exhibit at the Natural History Museum of Los Angeles County (Los Angeles, CA)
 FAO Schwarz Flagship Store (NYC)
 Food Hall at the Plaza Hotel (NYC)
 Frye Flagship Store (NYC)
 Klyde Warren Park (Dallas, TX)
 Knoll Showrooms (LA, SF, Dallas, Chicago, Miami, Philadelphia)
 Le Cirque 2000, 2006 (NYC) 
 Mall at Millennia (Orlando, FL)
 Marcus Center for the Performing Arts (Milwaukee, WI)
 Mohegan Casino Phase 1 & 3 (Connecticut)
 MoMa Home Delivery Exhibition (NYC)
 Mondrian Hotel (South Beach, FL) 
 Morimoto (Philadelphia, PA)
 One and Only Ocean Club (Paradise Island, Bahamas)
 Proenza Schouler (NYC)
 Public Theatre Library Lounge (NYC)
 "Reflect" Installation at the Stephen P. Clark Government Center (Miami, FL)
 Retail Concourse at the Plaza Hotel (NYC)
 Royalton Hotel
 "Science Storms" Exhibit at the Museum of Science and Industry (Chicago, IL)
 Semiramis Hotels (Athens, Greece)
 Shigeru Ban’s Metal Shutter House Condo (NYC)
 Space Shuttle Pavilion at the Intrepid Sea, Air & Space Museum (NYC)
 The Crystals at MGM City Center (Las Vegas, NV)
 Times Square Ball 100th and 101st Anniversary Ball (NYC)
 Todd English's Olives (NYC)
 Toys "R" Us Times Square (NYC)
 YOTEL (NYC)

Awards
 1995 Lumen Award, Waterbury Award of Excellence - Entel Tower
 1997 Lumen Award - Mohegan Casino Phase I
 1998 Lumen Award of Merit - Best Cellars
 1998 Lumen Award of Merit - ID Magazine Exhibit
 2002 IALD Award of Merit - Morimoto Restaurant
 2002 Lumen Award Citation - Town Restaurant
 2003 Lumen Award, Edwin F. Guth Award of Excellence - Mall at Millenia
 2004 Lumen Feltman Award - Carlos Miele
 2004 Lumen Award of Merit - Powder Deep Studios
 2005 Lumen Award of Merit - FAO Schwarz
 2005 Lumen Award of Excellence - Teatro Bar
 2005 Lumen Award of Excellence - Semiramis Hotel
 2005 AL Light & Architecture Design Award – Carlos Miele
 2006 IALD Award of Excellence – Tourneau Flagship Store
 2008 Lumen Award, Citation for Increasing Public Awareness of LEDs - Times Square Ball
 2009 Lumen Award – Royalton Hotel
 2009 Lumen Award - Mohegan Sun Casino of the Wind
 2009 Lumen Award, Citation for Courtyard Design- Rock Sugar L.A.
 2010 Lumen Award – Bourbon Steak
 2010 Lumen Award – Aureole 
 2011 IALD Award – Science Storms at the Museum of Science and Industry, Chicago
 2011 Lumen Award – Science Storms at the Museum of Science and Industry, Chicago
 2012 Lumen Award – Yotel
 2012 IALD Award – Yotel
 2013 IES Award of Excellence – Reflect
 2013 AL Light & Architecture Award – Space Shuttle Pavilion at the Intrepid

References

External links
 Focus Lighting

Lighting brands
Design companies of the United States
Manufacturing companies based in New York City
American companies established in 1986
Design companies established in 1986
Manufacturing companies established in 1986
1986 establishments in New York City